Raymond Marvin Elder (August 19, 1942 – November 24, 2011) was a NASCAR Grand National and Winston Cup Series driver.

He participated primarily in west coast races at Riverside International Raceway and Ontario Motor Speedway from 1967 to 1978. He won races at Riverside in 1971 and 1972 driving for Fred Elder.  Elder won 47 races on the NASCAR Pacific Coast Late Model Series, which is the second most all time. He won six NASCAR Western series championships: 1969, 1970, 1971, 1972, 1974, and 1975.

Winning at the 1971 Motor Trend 500 race would essentially make him the first winner in NASCAR's "modern" history.

Motorsports career results

NASCAR
(key) (Bold – Pole position awarded by qualifying time. Italics – Pole position earned by points standings or practice time. * – Most laps led.)

Grand National Series

Winston Cup Series

Daytona 500

Winston West Series

Award
Elder was inducted into the Fresno County Athletic Hall of Fame in 1990.
He was inducted in the West Coast Stock Car Hall of Fame in its first class in 2002.

References

External links
 

1942 births
2011 deaths
NASCAR drivers
People from Fresno County, California
Racing drivers from California